Michael Jarrell (born 8 October 1958) is a Swiss composer and academic teacher, whose operas, such as Cassandre, have been performed internationally.

Life 
Born in Geneva, Jarrell studied at the Geneva Conservatoire, and later with Klaus Huber in Freiburg. His works span many genres. In 1982, he won first prizes for composition and went on to win many more, including the Acanthes Prize in 1983, the Beethovenpreis awarded by Bonn in 1986, the Marescotti Prize (1986), both the Gaudeamus International Composers Award and the Henriette Renié prizes in 1988, and the Siemens-Förderpreis (1990).

From 1986 to 1988, he was resident at the Cité des Arts in Paris, taking part in the computer music course at IRCAM. His next residency was at the Villa Médici (1988–89), home of the French Academy in Rome, followed by membership of the Istituto Svizzero di Roma in 1989–90, after which he became composer-in-residence at the Orchestre de Lyon (October 1991–June 1993). In 1993, Jarrell was appointed professor of composition at the University of Music and Performing Arts, Vienna.

In 1990, he established some of the bases of Computer Music. In 2016, the composition problem he proposed was successfully solved using a Constraint programming.

In 1996, he became composer-in-residence at Lucerne Festival, while the 2000 Musica Nova Helsinki festival was dedicated to him. In 2001, the Salzburg Festival commissioned a piano concerto entitled Abschied (Farewell). The same year, Jarrell was made a Chevalier of the Order of Arts and Letters. In 2004, he was named professor of composition at the higher Academy of Geneva.

He is regarded throughout Europe as one of the most important Swiss composers of his generation.  His "spoken opera" Cassandre, which is based on Christa Wolf's novel Cassandra, was premiered in Paris in 1994 and performed at the Ojai Festival, CA, in June 2008.

References

External links
 
 
 
 Michael Jarrell at Musinfo – List of works and short bio

1958 births
Living people
Swiss classical composers
20th-century classical composers
Gaudeamus Composition Competition prize-winners
Swiss male classical composers
Ernst von Siemens Composers' Prize winners
Musicians from Geneva
20th-century male musicians
20th-century Swiss composers